Chambly was an electoral district of the Legislative Assembly of the Parliament of the Province of Canada, in Canada East.  It was created in 1841, based on the previous electoral district of the same name for the Legislative Assembly of Lower Canada, for an area south of Montreal. It was represented by one member in the Legislative Assembly. 

The electoral district was abolished in 1867, upon the creation of Canada and the province of Quebec.

Boundaries 

The Union Act, 1840 merged the two provinces of Upper Canada and Lower Canada into the Province of Canada, with a single Parliament.  The separate parliaments of Lower Canada and Upper Canada were abolished.Union Act, 1840, 3 & 4 Vict., c. 35, s. 2.

The Union Act provided that the pre-existing electoral boundaries of Lower Canada and Upper Canada would continue to be used in the new Parliament, unless altered by the Union Act itself. The Chambly electoral district of Lower Canada was not altered by the Act, and therefore continued with the same boundaries which had been set by a statute of Lower Canada in 1829:

The electoral district was located south of Montreal, in the Montérégie region.  The elections were held at Longueuil.

Chambly was a single-member constituency.

Members of the Legislative Assembly 

The following were the members of the Legislative Assembly from Chambly.

Abolition 

The district was abolished on July 1, 1867, when the British North America Act, 1867 came into force, splitting the Province of Canada into Quebec and Ontario.  It was succeeded by electoral districts of the same name in the House of Commons of Canada and the Legislative Assembly of Quebec.

References 

Electoral districts of Canada East